TD Canada Trust Tower former known as Eaton Centre Tower, is an  office tower in Calgary, Alberta, Canada.

Building information
The 41-storey TD Canada Trust Tower is located at 421 7th Avenue SW, and sits above a four-level retail podium (The Core Shopping Centre). TD Canada Trust Tower was designed by WZMH Architects in the postmodern style and was built by PCL Construction in 1991. The building is managed by 20 VIC Properties.

In addition to TD Canada Trust, the tower is home to:

 TD Securities
 Macquarie Group
 Apache Corporation
 McCarthy Tetrault

The site was once the Eaton's Calgary flagship store (1929 to 1980s). Some of the store's original walls have been retained and incorporated into the facade of The Core's retail podium.

As of 2020, the TD Canada Trust Tower is listed by the Council on Tall Buildings and Urban Habitat as the 15th tallest building in Calgary and 82nd tallest building in Canada.

See also
List of tallest buildings in Calgary

Gallery

References

External links

Postmodern architecture in Canada
Skyscrapers in Calgary
Bank buildings in Canada
WZMH Architects buildings
1991 establishments in Alberta
Ivanhoé Cambridge
Skyscraper office buildings in Canada

Office buildings completed in 1991